Joseph H. Hawkins (died 1823) was a United States Congressman from Kentucky. He was born in Lexington, Kentucky and pursued an academic course. He studied law and was admitted to the bar. He was a member of the Kentucky State House of Representatives from 1810 to 1813 and served two years as Speaker.

He was elected as a Republican to the Thirteenth Congress to fill the vacancy caused by the resignation of Henry Clay (1814–1815). Hawkins was not a candidate for renomination in 1814 and resumed the practice of law. He also engaged in mercantile pursuits.

He moved to New Orleans in 1819.  Hawkins died in the vicinity of Madisonville, Louisiana (An area on the north shore of Lake Pontchartrain above New Orleans) in 1823 of Yellow Fever worsened while helping distressed sailors near the shore of the lake behind his home. His financial contributions, as well as the sacrifices of his children, aided Stephen F. Austin and others in the colonization of Texas, the Texas Revolution (His son Norborne was killed in the Goliad Massacre) and later the Republic of Texas.

References

External links

18th-century births
Year of birth missing
1823 deaths
Politicians from Lexington, Kentucky
Kentucky lawyers
Speakers of the Kentucky House of Representatives
Democratic-Republican Party members of the United States House of Representatives from Kentucky
19th-century American lawyers